Master Harold...and the Boys is a 1984 American made-for-television drama film by Athol Fugard, adapted from his 1982 play of the same title, directed by Michael Lindsay-Hogg. The film originally premiered on Showtime on November 12, 1984 and was also aired on PBS as a presentation of Great Performances on November 15, 1985.

Plot
This film adaptation of Athol Fugard's semi-autobiographical play takes place in 1950 South Africa during the apartheid era. depicting how institutionalized racism, bigotry or hatred can become absorbed by those who live under it. The original play was temporarily banned from production in South Africa. The film is rated PG-13.

Zakes Mokae, who plays Sam, reprises the role that won him the 1982 Tony Award for Featured Actor in a Play.

Cast
 Matthew Broderick as Hally
 John Kani as Willie
 Zakes Mokae as Sam

References

External links
 
 

1984 films
1984 television films
1985 television films
1985 films
1984 drama films
American films based on actual events
Television shows based on plays
Films directed by Michael Lindsay-Hogg
Showtime (TV network) films
PBS original programming
American drama television films
1980s American films